Edward Roman (June 2, 1930 – March 1, 1988) was an American college basketball player.  He was the leading scorer of the 1949–50 CCNY Beavers men's basketball team, the only team to win both the NCAA tournament and the National Invitation Tournament (NIT) in the same year.  He was also a central figure in the point shaving scandal that came to light in the aftermath of that season.

College career
Roman, a 6'6" center, followed his Taft High School teammate Irwin Dambrot to play college basketball for Nat Holman at the City College of New York.  Roman was part of a strong 1948 recruiting class for the Beavers.  Roman, forward Ed Warner, point guard Alvin Roth and shooting guard Floyd Layne would comprise four-fifths of the starting lineup for CCNY's double championship squad in their first year of eligibility.  Roman led the team in scoring that year at 16.4 points per game and was named to the All-tournament team for the 1950 NCAA Tournament.

Point shaving scandal
The next season, junior Roman and teammate Ed Warner were named co-captains for the Beavers and were poised to defend their championship titles.  However, on February 18, 1951, New York City District Attorney Frank Hogan arrested seven Beavers for shaving points in three games during the championship season - including Ed Roman.  Roman was sentenced to six months in prison but received a suspended sentence.

For his involvement in fixing games, Ed Roman was banned for life from the National Basketball Association.  The City College of New York would deemphasize athletics as a result of the scandal.

Later life
After two years in the Army, Roman finished his studies (ultimately receiving a doctorate at New York University) and worked in the city public school system in Queens as a teacher of physical education and, after the mid-1970s, as a psychological consultant. He had three children: Mark, Joanne and Tammy.  Ed Roman died on March 1, 1988, of leukemia.

References

1930 births
1988 deaths
American men's basketball players
Basketball players from New York City
CCNY Beavers men's basketball players
Centers (basketball)
Jewish men's basketball players
New York University alumni
Sportspeople involved in betting scandals
Sportspeople from the Bronx